San Jon is a village in Quay County, New Mexico, United States. The population was 216 at the 2010 census.

History 
The village was founded in 1902 and grew after the arrival of the railroad in 1904. It was once an important local commercial center and stop on U.S. Route 66 and home to numerous tourist-oriented businesses, such as gasoline service stations, cafes and motels. However, when Interstate 40 bypassed the village in 1981, the local economy went into a decline, leading most of those businesses to shut down. Today, only one motel is still in operation and all of the gas stations and dining establishments are centered around the I-40 interchange on the north side of town. Some former establishments were The Old Route 66 Truck and Auto Parts garage, Smith's Café, the Circle M Motel.

Geography
San Jon is located at  (35.107614, -103.330396).

The village is located on I-40 at New Mexico State Highway 469 and is east of Tucumcari.

Climate

Demographics

As of the census of 2000, there were 306 people, 118 households, and 82 families residing in the village. The population density was 116.5 people per square mile (44.9/km). There were 133 housing units at an average density of 50.6 per square mile (19.5/km). The racial makeup of the village was 87.91% White, 1.63% Native American, 6.54% from other races, and 3.92% from two or more races. Hispanic or Latino of any race were 32.03% of the population.

There were 118 households, out of which 37.3% had children under the age of 18 living with them, 56.8% were married couples living together, 12.7% had a female householder with no husband present, and 29.7% were non-families. 28.0% of all households were made up of individuals, and 14.4% had someone living alone who was 65 years of age or older. The average household size was 2.59 and the average family size was 3.24.

In the village, the population was spread out, with 30.7% under the age of 18, 5.9% from 18 to 24, 24.5% from 25 to 44, 21.9% from 45 to 64, and 17.0% who were 65 years of age or older. The median age was 36 years. For every 100 females, there were 74.9 males. For every 100 females age 18 and over, there were 78.2 males.

The median income for a household in the village was $22,917, and the median income for a family was $27,000. Males had a median income of $30,000 versus $16,607 for females. The per capita income for the village was $11,592. About 14.3% of families and 16.8% of the population were below the poverty line, including 26.7% of those under the age of eighteen and 13.6% of those 65 or over.

References

External links

  Brief information about San Jon
  Old San Jon

Villages in Quay County, New Mexico
Villages in New Mexico
Populated places established in 1902